Chibirley is a village in Penza Oblast, Russia, roughly  southeast of Moscow.

Notable residents 

Yevgeny Rodionov (1977–1996), Russian soldier captured and executed by Chechen rebels in the First Chechen War

Cities and towns in Penza Oblast